The LSU Indoor Practice Facility, built in 1991, is a climate-controlled 83,580 square feet facility connected to the Football Operations Center and adjacent to LSU's four outdoor 100-yard football practice fields. It holds the 100-yd Anderson-Feazel LSU indoor field. The playing surface is Momentum Field Turf by SportExe. The indoor practice facility is adjacent to both the football-only weight room and LSU's four outdoor practice fields. Besides allowing the team to practice during inclement weather, the indoor practice facility is used for LSU's summer endurance training and summer football camps.

The LSU Lady Tigers soccer team uses the facility when inclement weather prevents the team from practicing at the LSU Soccer Stadium.

See also
Charles McClendon Practice Facility 
LSU Football Operations Center
LSU Tigers football
Tiger Stadium (LSU)
LSU Tigers and Lady Tigers

References

External links
LSU Football Operations Center at the Charles McClendon Practice Facility

American football venues in Baton Rouge, Louisiana
College football venues
LSU Tigers football venues
LSU Tigers women's soccer venues
Sports venues completed in 1991
1991 establishments in Louisiana